The list of fish in Ukraine consists of indigenous, and also introduced species.

These tags are used to evaluate the conservation status of species by criteria of IUCN:

All the listed species are classified by their origin as freshwater, brackishwater, marine, anadromous, catadromous, and euryhaline; also classified as native, introduced, invasive, and species with accidental finding (difficult to characterize it as native or invasive).

See also 
 Fauna of Ukraine

References 
 Movchan Yu.V. (2011) Fishes of Ukraine, Kiev, 420 pp. (in Ukrainian)
 Vasilyeva Ye.D. (2007) Fishes of the Black Sea, VNIRO, Moscow, 238 pp. (in Russian)
 
 Black Sea Fishes Check List
 Kovtun O.A. (2012) First records goby Gammogobius steinitzi Bath, 1971 (Actinopterygii, Perciformes, Gobiidae) in coastal grottoes of the western Crimea (Black Sea) (A preliminary report). Marine Ecological Journal, 3(11): 56. (in Russian)
 Alexander Barb (2016) Fish-Guide-Ukraine. Illustrated Atlas. (in Ukrainian/English)

Ukraine
Fish
Fish
Ukraine